Princess and the Scribe is a 2014 Czech television film directed by Karel Janák. It is a fairy tale action film. It premiered on 24 December 2014. It was viewed by more than 2 million people (51% share).

Cast
 Matouš Ruml as Scribe Janek
 Monika Timková (date of birth: 11.10.1990, place of birth: Trutnov, Czechoslovakia) as Princess Amálka
 Maroš Kramár (date of birth: 26.04.1959, place of birth: Bratislava, Czechoslovakia) as Dietrich
 Jiří Bartoška as the King
 Petr Nárožný as Scapani
 Jiří Hána (date of birth: 29.09.1976, place of birth: Ústi nad Labem, Czechoslovakia) as Ludvík
 Radim Kalvoda (date of birth: 19.04.1973, place of birth: Vsetin, Czechoslovakia) as Herkul
 Norbert Lichý (date of birth: 29.12.1964, place of birth: Ostrava, Czechoslovakia) as Stach

Production
The film was shot during 2014 at Velhartice Castle,  Martinice palace and on Ploučnice.

References

External links
 
 Official website

2014 television films
2014 films
2010s Czech-language films
Czech action films
Czech children's films
Czech television films
Czech Television original films
Films based on fairy tales